Krajná Bystrá is a village and municipality in Svidník District in the Prešov Region of north-eastern Slovakia.

History
In historical records the village was first mentioned in 1618.

Geography
It has a population of about 335 people.

Genealogical resources
The records for genealogical research are available at the state archive "Statny Archiv in Presov, Slovakia"

 Greek Catholic church records (births/marriages/deaths): 1862-1895 (parish A)

See also
 List of municipalities and towns in Slovakia

References

External links
 
 
Surnames of living people in Krajna Bystra

Villages and municipalities in Svidník District
Šariš